The Holden FC series is an automobile produced by Holden in Australia from 1958 to 1960. Introduced on 6 May 1958, the FC is a facelifted and improved version of the Holden FE series, which it replaced.  Although it is exclusively an Australian design, the styling is reminiscent of a scaled-down North American 1955 Chevrolet.

Model range 
The FC range consisted of four-door sedans in three trim levels, five-door station wagons, marketed as "Station Sedans" in two trim levels, a two-door coupe utility and a three-door panel van. The seven models were:
 Holden Standard Sedan
 Holden Standard Station Sedan
 Holden Business Sedan
 Holden Special Sedan
 Holden Special Station Sedan
 Holden Utility
 Holden Panel Van

Changes 
Although the FC series was substantially the same as the FE, it featured revisions to the radiator grille, body trim and interior. Minor mechanical improvements were also made, with changes to the engine, suspension, brakes, gearchange linkages and the steering box. The Utility now featured painted rather than chromed grille and headlight rims, as did the Panel Van.

Engine 
All FC models were powered by a  six-cylinder engine producing . This engine was carried over from the FE series, although the camshaft was altered, the compression ratio was increased and torque was improved.

Production and replacement 
After a production run of 191,724 vehicles, the FC was replaced by the Holden FB series in January 1960. The FC was the first Holden to be regularly available in Indonesia.

References

External links 
 Holden FC history Retrieved from www.uniquecarsandparts.com.au on 30 April 2009

Cars of Australia
FC
Cars introduced in 1958 
1960s cars